Marinópolis is a municipality in the state of São Paulo in Brazil. The population is 2,106 (2020 est.) in an area of 77.8 km². The elevation is 408 m.

References

Municipalities in São Paulo (state)